Guram Kostava (born 18 June 1937) is a Soviet fencer. Kostava won a bronze in the team épée event at the 1960 Summer Olympics and another one in the individual épée event at the 1964 Summer Olympics.

References

1937 births
Living people
Soviet male fencers
Olympic fencers of the Soviet Union
Fencers at the 1960 Summer Olympics
Fencers at the 1964 Summer Olympics
Olympic bronze medalists for the Soviet Union
Olympic medalists in fencing
Sportspeople from Tbilisi
Medalists at the 1960 Summer Olympics
Medalists at the 1964 Summer Olympics